Legs Cross is an Anglo-Saxon cross in the parish of Bolam, County Durham, England, about  north of Piercebridge on the Pilgrims' Way (the modern B6275 and the old Roman road of Dere Street). It is a Grade II* listed structure, and a scheduled monument.

It was probably erected in the 9th century.

Some interlaced patterning remains.

Although it once had an inscription reading "LEG", giving rise to the name. It has been suggested that the cross was constructed from Roman masonry (nearby Piercebridge was once the site of a Roman fort) and that the inscription may have originally celebrated the 20th Legion (LEGIONIS).

Other theories for the origin of name include the fact that "legge" is the Anglo-Saxon word meaning "boundary." It has been also suggested that James VI of Scotland (later James I of England) rested here, with his legs crossed, on his way south to claim the English throne.

References

External links

High crosses in England
Monuments and memorials in County Durham
Monumental crosses in England
Grade II* listed buildings in County Durham
Scheduled monuments in County Durham